H. sanguinea  may refer to:
 Heuchera sanguinea, the coral bells, a flowering plant species in the genus Heuchera
 Himatione sanguinea, the ʻapapane, a bird species endemic to Hawaii
 Holmskioldia sanguinea, a flowering plant species